"Old Country Soul" is a song co-written and recorded by Canadian country duo The Reklaws. The song was co-written by the duo with Dakota Jay, William King, and Travis Wood. It was the fifth single off their debut studio album Freshman Year.

Critical reception
Taryn McElheran of Canadian Beats Media highlighted the presence of both Walker siblings vocals adding that the song "mixes both new and old country sound creating a new and catchy tune".

Commercial performance
"Old Country Soul" reached peaks of #4 on the Billboard Canada Country chart, and #87 on the Canadian Hot 100, both for the week of February 8, 2020. It was certified Platinum by Music Canada.

Music video
The official music video for "Old Country Soul" premiered on September 12, 2019. It features both Jenna Walker and Stuart Walker of the Reklaws, and was directed by Ben Knechtel.

Credits and personnel
Credits adapted from Freshman Year CD booklet.

Todd Clark — production, engineering, programming, backing vocals, guitar, keyboard
Matty Green — mixing
Andrew Mendelson — mastering
Justin Schipper — dobro
Jenna Walker — lead vocals
Stuart Walker — lead vocals
Derek Wells — guitar, mandolin

Charts

Certifications

References
 

2019 songs
2019 singles
The Reklaws songs 
Songs written by Jenna Walker
Songs written by Stuart Walker (singer)
Songs written by Travis Wood (songwriter)
Universal Music Canada singles
Song recordings produced by Todd Clark